Ağın District is a district of Elazığ Province of Turkey. Its seat is the town Ağın. Its area is 242 km2, and its population is 2,746 (2021).

Composition
There is 1 municipality in Ağın District:
Ağın

There are 16 villages in Ağın District:

 Altınayva
 Aşağıyabanlı
 Bademli
 Bahadırlar
 Balkayası
 Beyelması
 Demirçarık
 Dibekli
 Kaşpınar
 Modanlı
 Öğrendik
 Pulköy
 Samançay
 Saraycık
 Yedibağ
 Yenipayam

Demographics 
The district with the exception of Saraycık village is populated by Turks. Saraycık is populated by Kurds. There are moreover a couple of Alevi villages in the district.

References

Districts of Elazığ Province